Juba is the capital and largest city of South Sudan. The city is situated on the White Nile and also serves as the capital of the Central Equatoria State. It is the world's newest capital city to be elevated as such, and had a population of 525,953 in 2017.

Juba was established in 1920–21 by the Church Missionary Society (CMS) in a small Bari village, also called Juba. The city was made as the capital of Mongalla Province in the late 1920s. The growth of the town accelerated following the signing of the Comprehensive Peace Agreement in 2005, which made Juba the capital of the Autonomous Government of Southern Sudan. Juba became the capital of South Sudan in 2011 after its independence, but influential parties wanted Ramciel to be the capital. The government announced the move of the capital to Ramciel, but it is yet to occur.

History

Under the Khedivate of Egypt, Juba served as the southernmost garrison of the Egyptian army, quartering only a handful of soldiers. Disease was common; soldiers often fell ill due to the malaria, meningitis and blackwater fever that was prevalent in the region. Explorers and campaigners (Sir) Samuel and Florence Baker used the nearby island of Gondokoro as a base during their expeditions to what is now South Sudan and northern Uganda from 1863 to 1865 and 1871 to 1873.

The present city of Juba was established on the site of a small Bari village,  also called Juba, where the Church Missionary Society (CMS) had established a mission and the Nugent Memorial Intermediate School in 1920–21.  In the late 1920s, Anglo-Egyptian officials ordered Bari residents to relocate so that a new town could be constructed to serve as the capital of Mongalla Province.  The site was chosen by Anglo-Egyptian officials partly because of the presence of the CMS Nugent Memorial Intermediate School there, and partly because its proximity to river transportation on the Nile.  Major construction of the new city of Juba was underway by 1927.  Traders from Rejaf relocated to the new city in 1929, and the Governor's office of Mongalla was moved there in 1930.

Greek merchants supplying the British Army played an early and central role in the establishment of Juba in the early 1920s. Their number never exceeded 2,000, but because of their excellent relationship with the native Bari people and the large amount of resulting assistance they received, they built many structures in the downtown Juba Market area as well as in the area which the contemporary British soldiers called the Greek Quarter, today the small suburb of Hai Jalaba. Many of these structures are still standing today. Public buildings such as the Ivory Bank, Notos Lounge, the old Sudan Airways Building, Paradise Hotel, and the Nile Commercial Bank and Buffalo Commercial Bank were all built by Greeks. Greek merchants were responsible for the construction of the Central Bank building in the mid-1940s, as well as the Juba Hotel in the mid-1930s.

Until 1956, Juba was in Anglo-Egyptian Sudan, which was jointly administered by the United Kingdom and the Kingdom of Egypt. British hopes to join the southern part of Sudan with Uganda were dashed in 1947 during the Juba Conference, which resulted in an agreement to unify northern and southern Sudan. In 1955, a mutiny of southern soldiers in Torit sparked the First Sudanese Civil War, which did not end until 1972. During the Second Sudanese Civil War, Juba was a strategic location that was the focus of much fighting.

In 2005, Juba became the interim seat and the capital of the Autonomous Government of Southern Sudan after the signing of the Comprehensive Peace Agreement (before the agreement, Rumbek had been the proposed interim capital). With the advent of peace, the United Nations increased its presence in Juba, shifting its management of operations in Southern Sudan from its previous location in Kenya. Under the leadership of the United Nations Office for the Coordination of Humanitarian Affairs, the United Nations established a camp known as "OCHA Camp", which served as a base for many United Nations agencies and non-governmental organizations. 

Juba became the world's newest national capital on 9 July 2011, when South Sudan formally declared its independence from the Republic of the Sudan. However, influential parties including the South Sudanese government expressed dissatisfaction with the city's suitability as a national capital, and the government proposed that a new planned city be built as a replacement capital elsewhere, most likely Ramciel in Lakes.

On 5 September 2011, the government announced the capital of South Sudan would move some 250 km away from Juba to Ramciel, which is located in the middle of South Sudan, about 60 km from Yirol West County, Lakes State. As of June 2020, the move has yet to occur.

In September 2015, nearly 200 people were killed in a tanker explosion in Juba.

Government
Juba is led by a city council headed by Mayor Stephen Wani Michael. This post-independence council was formed in March 2011 and Baballa appointed to lead it by Governor Clement Wani Konga. Former Yei County Commissioner David Lokonga Moses was appointed as deputy mayor. A ministerial committee to keep Juba clean and sanitary was also created by gubernatorial decree at the same time.

Prior to March 2011, the area now administered by Juba City Council was divided into Juba, Kator, and Muniki payams. It is now a standalone subdivision of Juba County, of which it is the county seat.

Transportation

The city is a river port and the southern terminus of traffic along the Nile, properly called the Bahr al Jabal section of the White Nile. Before the civil war, Juba was also a transport hub, with highways connecting it to Kenya, Uganda and the Democratic Republic of the Congo.

After the war, Juba has no longer been a significant trade city. Roads and the river harbour are not in use due to disrepair. The United Nations and the South Sudanese government are repairing the roads, but full repair is expected to take many years. In 2003, the Swiss Foundation for Mine Action (FSD) started to clear the roads leading from Juba to Uganda and Kenya. It was expected that these roads would be completely de-mined and rebuilt in the course of 2006–2008.  The rebuilding of the roads, which are mostly unpaved, takes a tremendous amount of effort and time because of the limited work season due to the lengthy rainy season, which lasts from March until October. The roads are important for the peace process in Sudan as people need them to return to their homes and to regain what they feel is a normal life. The first road that has started to be rebuilt is the road to Uganda. This road is particularly important, as many of the original inhabitants of Juba fled to Uganda during the war. , there are three paved roads in Juba, one that was re-surfaced in July. The main one is a concrete road, built by the British in the 1950s. 

Between 2008 and 2011, the Ugandan government and the South Sudanese government undertook joint efforts to develop a railway link between the Northern Ugandan city of Gulu and Juba, with an extension to Wau. A memorandum of understanding between the two governments was signed to that effect in August 2008. The same memorandum outlined plans to develop the road network between the two countries. Recent media reports from the region suggest that the railway link from Juba may link directly with Kenya, bypassing Uganda.

Juba International Airport  is the site of large numbers of flights bringing UN and NGO (non-governmental organization) aid into Southern Sudan, as well as passengers and general air freight. The construction of a new terminal was begun in late 2007 when the oil prices were very high ($100+). Since then, with the oil prices going back down, the fate of the new terminal is uncertain. Building on the new terminal restarted in early 2014  As of February 2014, there are daily flights to Jomo Kenyatta International Airport in Nairobi, Kenya; Khartoum International Airport in Sudan; Entebbe International Airport in Entebbe, Uganda; and Bole International Airport in Addis Ababa, Ethiopia. The United Nations Mission in South Sudan (UNMISS) has a large compound near the Juba Airport.

Demography
In 2005, Juba's population was 163,442. Based on analysis of aerial photos, the best estimate of several donors working in Juba calculated the 2006 population at approximately 250,000. The 5th Sudan Population and Housing Census took place in April/May 2008, stating the population of Juba County to be 372,413 (the majority residing in Juba City, which dominates the county), but the results were rejected by the Autonomous Government of Southern Sudan. Juba is developing very rapidly due to oil money and the Chinese coming for work and development.  In 2011, the population of the city of Juba is estimated at 372,410, but may potentially be more. , the city's population was growing at a rate of 4.23%.

Economy
Juba has been described as undergoing an economic boom, especially in the past five years and since independence.  The prospect of an economic boom has brought thousands of merchants to Juba, mostly from northern Sudan and from East Africa. , several regional and international businesses have established a presence in Juba. The Commercial Bank of Ethiopia and the Kenyan banking conglomerate Kenya Commercial Bank has its South Sudanese headquarters in the city and a branch network of eleven (11) branches throughout South Sudan. The three indigenous South Sudanese commercial banks namely; Buffalo Commercial Bank, Ivory Bank and Nile Commercial Bank, all maintain their headquarters in Juba. Equity Bank, another regional finance services provider also has a branch in Juba. National Insurance Corporation (NIC), the leading Ugandan insurance services provider, maintains an office in the city. Despite recent economic difficulties brought about by the December 15th 2013 civil war, Juba has continued to grow and construction is still booming. This is probably due to the high demand for affordable housing and hotel accommodations. Research from the Overseas Development Institute found that markets in Juba are transient, as many traders only come to make a quick profit and so do not invest in storage facilities or shops.

Education 
The University of Juba was founded in 1975.
Upper Nile University in Juba
The Juba Public Peace Library was founded on October 1, 2019. The library was donated by The South Sudan Library Foundation and contains over 13,000 books.  It is the first public library of South Sudan.  The South Sudan Library Foundation was co-founded by Yawusa Kintha and Kevin Lenahan.

Kampala International University
Catholic University of South Sudan
Episcopal University of South Sudan
Starford International University 
Ayii University

Health services 

 Juba Teaching Hospital
 Juba Military Referral Hospital
Al Sabah Children's Hospital
 Nyakurun PHCC
 Munuki PHCC
 Gurei PHCC

Places of worship 
Among the places of worship, they are predominantly Christian churches and temples : Roman Catholic Archdiocese of Juba (Catholic Church), Province of the Episcopal Church of South Sudan (Anglican Communion), Baptist Convention of South Sudan (Baptist World Alliance), Presbyterian Church in Sudan (World Communion of Reformed Churches). There are also Muslim mosques.

Climate
Juba has a tropical wet and dry climate (Köppen: Aw), and as it lies near the equator, temperatures are hot year-round. However, little rain falls from November to March, which is also the time of the year with the hottest maximum temperatures, reaching  in February.

Notable people

Aheu Deng, beauty queen and fashion model
Bangs, rapper and YouTube personality
 Mangok Mathiang (born 1992), Australian-Sudanese basketball player for Hapoel Eilat of the Israeli Basketball Premier League
 Independent Moses Nunuh, first child born in South Sudan after its independence. In common with many other children in South Sudan, he died before his first birthday.

See also

Equatoria
Eastern Equatoria
Central Equatoria
Western Equatoria
Gulu-Nimule Road
Juba Stadium
Lainya County
Railway stations in South Sudan
Anataban Campaign

References

External links

 Fisher, J. 2005, 'Southern Sudan's Front-line Town', BBC News, 20 April 2005.
 Holt, K. 2007, 'In pictures: Juba's Street Struggle', BBC News, 4 January 2007.
Sudan And Uganda Sign MoU To Develop Infrastructure
'Gulu-Juba rail link underway'
World's Newest Nation would Start Almost from Scratch – article & video by McClatchy

 
State capitals in South Sudan
Capitals in Africa
Populated places in Jubek State
Populated places on the Nile
Populated places established in 1922
1922 establishments in Africa